The Southerns cricket team was a first-class cricket team in Zimbabwe. They competed in the Logan Cup from 2006 to 2008. The club played their home matches at the Masvingo Sports Club.

First-class record

References 

Former senior cricket clubs in Zimbabwe
Former Zimbabwean first-class cricket teams
Cricket teams in Zimbabwe